Serenus may refer to:

Saint Serenus the Gardener (Sirenatus, Cerneuf), also known as Serenus of Sirmium
Saint Serenus of Alexandria (died 202 AD), Egyptian martyr
Serenus Sammonicus, a Roman scholar
Serenus of Antinoöpolis, also known as Serenus of Antinoeia, a mathematician from Antinoöpolis.
Serenus, a messiah claimant (circa 720)
 Serenicus and Serenidus of Saulges